Ángel González Castaños (born 3 December 1958) is a Spanish former footballer who played as a left winger.

Club career
Born in Ciudad Rodrigo, Province of Salamanca, González started out at RCD Español, making his La Liga debut on 5 April 1978 in a 1–3 home loss against Atlético Madrid where he came on as a 64th-minute substitute. It was one of only three appearances during the season. The following campaign, he was loaned to neighbouring club CE Sabadell FC in Segunda División, being conscripted to military service in the city.

In the top flight, González also represented UD Salamanca and CD Logroñés, for a total of 151 games and ten goals over seven seasons. He added 267 matches and 48 goals in the second tier, retiring in 1993 at the age of 34 after two years apiece with Palamós CF and UE Figueres, also in the Catalonia region.

International career
González represented Spain at the 1980 Summer Olympics, where they competed under the Olympic flag due to the boycott. In his hometown, plaques commemorated any Olympian born in the city, but he appeared to have been forgotten as his name was not listed.

References

External links

Olympic stats

1958 births
Living people
People from Ciudad Rodrigo
Sportspeople from the Province of Salamanca
Spanish footballers
Footballers from Castile and León
Association football wingers
La Liga players
Segunda División players
RCD Espanyol footballers
CE Sabadell FC footballers
UD Salamanca players
CD Logroñés footballers
Palamós CF footballers
UE Figueres footballers
Spain youth international footballers
Spain under-21 international footballers
Spain amateur international footballers
Olympic footballers of Spain
Footballers at the 1980 Summer Olympics